Jessica Tovey (born 10 November 1987) is an Australian actress. Tovey graduated from the Newtown High School of the Performing Arts and has made appearances for various drama companies. She is best known for her role of Belle Taylor on the long-running Australian soap opera Home and Away. Tovey joined the show in 2006 and was nominated for two Logie Awards during her time there. In 2009, she announced she had quit Home and Away and her character was killed off. Tovey became the face of American shoe company, Skechers. She appeared in Underbelly: The Golden Mile in 2010 and Paper Giants: The Birth of Cleo in 2011.

Career
Born in Sydney, Tovey graduated from the Newtown High School of the Performing Arts, where she appeared in a number of stage productions. She has played leading roles at Australian Theatre for Young People, drama festivals and in The Global Shakespeare Festival, where she won acclaim for her performance in Macbeth. In 2005, she joined the cast of children's program Wicked Science, as Nadine.

After completing her schooling, Tovey joined the cast of Home and Away in 2006 as Belle Taylor. For her portrayal of the character, Tovey was nominated for Most Popular New Female Talent and Most Popular Actress at the 2007 and 2010 Logie Awards respectively. In April 2009, Tovey announced that she had quit Home and Away and her character was killed off.

In 2008, American shoe company, Skechers announced that Tovey would be their new celebrity face. Tovey became the first non-American to feature in the brand's ad campaigns. Tovey joined the cast of Underbelly: The Golden Mile in April 2010, appearing as Constable Wendy Jones. In August, it was announced she had joined the cast of Panic at Rock Island, a Nine Network telemovie drama. Tovey also made a guest appearance on police drama Cops L.A.C.. She appeared in the 2011 ABC television miniseries Paper Giants: The Birth of Cleo as Leslie Carpenter. Tovey was cast as Dani Varvaris in the romantic-comedy drama Wonderland.

On stage, Tovey played in the world premiere of Lachlan Philpott's play Truck Stop for Sydney's Q Theatre Company in 2012. Further stage credits include Lola in a stage adaptation by Tom Holloway of Double Indemnity for the Melbourne Theatre Company in 2016, a touring production of Constellations by Nick Payne for the Queensland Theatre Company in 2017, and Portia in Bell Shakespeare's touring production of The Merchant of Venice the same year.

Personal life
Tovey is the daughter of author Libby Gleeson and Euan Tovey, a New Zealand research scientist. She has two older sisters, Amelia and Josephine. Her sister Josephine is a journalist for The Sydney Morning Herald.

Tovey has been in a relationship with actor Damien Strouthos since 2017. She gave birth to their first child, a daughter, in October 2021.

Filmography

References

External links

"Girl wonder" by Elissa Blake, The Sydney Morning Herald, 15 September 2013

1987 births
Living people
21st-century Australian actresses
Actresses from Sydney
Australian film actresses
Australian people of New Zealand descent
Australian soap opera actresses
Australian stage actresses
People educated at Newtown High School of the Performing Arts